Martin Andresen (born 2 February 1977) is a Norwegian former professional football player and manager, who played as a central midfielder.

Club career

Early career
Andresen was born in Kråkstad. He was a regular on many Norway national youth teams while playing for Moss, Viking and Stabæk Fotball from 1995 to 1999.

After the 1999 season, Andresen was sold to Premier League club Wimbledon in a deal worth £1 million. But like many of the other Norwegians in the club, his stay became short and unsuccessful. He scored once for Wimbledon; in a 2–1 loss to Liverpool. He had a short loan spell at Molde.

Return to Stabæk
Andresen returned to Stabæk in 2001, where he proved himself to be one of the best central midfielders in Norway.

After a successful 2003 season, where Stabæk captured the bronze medals in the Norwegian Premier League, Andresen was loaned out to the Premiership club Blackburn Rovers for six months in 2004, from February to August, but did not sign a longer deal with the English club. Andresen return to Stabæk to save the club from relegation from the Norwegian Premier League. Andresen played while injured and Stabæk could not save their top spot in league Norway. Andresen, not willing to play in the Adeccoliga, asked to be sold. Many clubs in Norway were interested in the national team captain; the high price scared many away, including the champions Rosenborg. Vålerenga looked set to capture Andresen at Christmas 2004. Brann was helped by local investors to sign him on 23 December 2004.

Brann
Andresen became the most expensive transfer in Brann history, in a deal worth ca. 15.000.000 NOK (£1.310.000). After a disappointing first season, much ruined by injuries, Andresen made it clear that he would be "fit for fight" in 2006. In the pre-season he was appointed captain for Brann, clearly showing his importance for the club on and off the field. In 2006, Brann had their best season opening ever, with Andresen filling the captain role. He also periodically captained team Norway, playing in central midfield. In 2007 Brann won the Norwegian League, with Andresen as captain. He was described as the most valuable player by many Norwegian pundits. He was also named in the Team of the Year.

Vålerenga
Andresen was announced as the new manager of Vålerenga on 6 November 2007 while still under contract with Brann for the remainder of the year. Brann terminated their working relationship with Andresen the day after. He signed a three-year-long contract with Vålerenga as player and manager. Andresen became the first player/head coach in Norway's top division (Tippeligaen) since Kjetil Rekdal (also with Vålerenga) in 2002.

He retired as a player before the 2010 season, but continued to play several matches for the reserve team in the Norwegian Second Division. In 2011, he played for Follo FK who were in the same division, making eight appearances for the club.

On 15 October 2012, Andresen was dismissed as manager for Vålerenga.

Second return to Stabæk
Andresen came out of retirement and joined Stabæk, who had been relegated from Tippeligaen, ahead of the 2013 season.

Sandefjord
Andresen came out for retirement for a second time on 18 August 2015, and joined Sandefjord Fotball for the remainder of the 2015 Tippeligaen season.

International career
Andresen made his debut for Norway national team in a 15 August 2001 friendly match against Turkey and earned a total of 43 caps, scoring three goals.

Personal life
Martin Andresen is an heir to the Norwegian furniture manufacturer Skeidar.

He is also a keen bridge player. In December 2009 he partnered Tor Helness to win one of the side events in the North American Bridge Championships in San Diego.

In November 2021, partnering Thor Erik Hoftaniska for Bergen Akademiske BK, Andresen won the EBL Champions' Cup.

Career statistics

Honours
Stabæk
Norwegian Cup: 1998

Brann
Norwegian Premier League: 2007

Vålerenga
Norwegian Cup: 2008

Individual
Kniksen of the year: 2003
Kniksen award: midfielder of the year in 2003
Norwegian Football Association Gold Watch

References

External links

1977 births
Living people
People from Ski, Norway
Norwegian footballers
Norway international footballers
Norway under-21 international footballers
Association football midfielders
Moss FK players
Viking FK players
Stabæk Fotball players
Wimbledon F.C. players
Molde FK players
Blackburn Rovers F.C. players
SK Brann players
Vålerenga Fotball players
Follo FK players
Eliteserien players
Premier League players
Norwegian First Division players
Norwegian Second Division players
Kniksen Award winners
Norwegian expatriate footballers
Expatriate footballers in England
Norwegian expatriate sportspeople in England
Norwegian football managers
Vålerenga Fotball managers
Eliteserien managers
Norwegian contract bridge players
Sportspeople from Viken (county)